Julie-Anne Dineen was an Irish singer who was a breast cancer survivor and an ambassador for fund raising for the cause. She released her charity single "Do You Believe" that reached #1 in the Irish Singles Chart in March 2009 staying for 1 week at the top of the chart. The proceeds went to the Symptomatic Breast Cancer unit at the Mid-Western Regional Hospital in Ireland, where Dineen had just finished treatment for breast cancer. She completed a tour of Limerick schools where she performed her chart topping song, spreading a cancer aware message. She followed her chart success with a Top 3 hit in Ireland, a cover of "River Deep – Mountain High" released in October 2009.

Julie Anne Dineen died in November, 2011.

Discography
March 2009: "Do You Believe" (reached #1 in the Irish Singles Chart)
October 2009: "River Deep – Mountain High" (reached #2 in the Irish Singles Chart)

References

External links
Facebook page

Irish women singers
Living people
Year of birth missing (living people)